She Haunts My Dreams is the second album by the American band Spain, released in 1999. The band was signed to DreamWorks Records shortly before the album's release, although Restless Records held Spain to its contract.

Production
The album's songs were written by Josh Haden. They are about romance and relationships. Joey Waronker played drums on the album; the piano parts were played by session musicians.

Critical reception

Spin called the album "a gorgeous meditation on romantic dysfunction." The Sydney Morning Herald praised the "muted-jazz/Leonard Cohen-knew-my-mother backing." USA Today concluded that "She Haunts My Dreams will be at the top of the list for a bunch of heartbroken losers come the end of the year."

The Sun-Herald wrote: "Stark, elegant and pervasively melancholic, Spain's lo-fi acoustic rumblings are purpose built for Haden's tales of woe." The Los Angeles Daily News noted that, "although plainly influenced by the Velvet Underground, Mazzy Star and the Tindersticks, the trio touches a hard-to-reach nerve with its wistful delivery and melancholic mood."

AllMusic deemed the album "dreamy, lounge-tinged pop." (The New) Rolling Stone Album Guide considered She Haunts My Dreams to be "artfully arranged mopiness." The Virginian-Pilot listed it among the 10 best albums of 1999; The Dallas Morning News considered it to be one of the "9 Best Albums of '99 That Fell through the Cracks".

Track listing

References

1999 albums
Restless Records albums